The Artistry of Freddie Hubbard is a 1963 album by trumpeter Freddie Hubbard, his first for Impulse! It contains performances by Hubbard, Curtis Fuller, John Gilmore, Tommy Flanagan, Art Davis and Louis Hayes.

Track listing
All compositions by Freddie Hubbard except where noted
 "Caravan" (Duke Ellington, Irving Mills, Juan Tizol) – 7:28
 "Bob's Place" – 10:03
 "Happy Times" – 4:29
 "Summertime" (George Gershwin, Ira Gershwin, Dubose Heyward) – 10:06
 "The 7th Day" – 10:34

Personnel
Freddie Hubbard – trumpet
Curtis Fuller – trombone
John Gilmore – tenor saxophone
Tommy Flanagan – piano
Art Davis – bass
Louis Hayes – drums

References

1963 albums
Freddie Hubbard albums
Albums produced by Bob Thiele
Impulse! Records albums